The 1863 Minnesota gubernatorial election was held on July 10, 1863 to elect the governor of Minnesota.

Results

References

1863
Minnesota
gubernatorial
July 1863 events